Lurich is a surname. Notable people with the surname include:

Georg Lurich (1876–1920), Estonian Greco-Roman wrestler and strongman
Tom Lurich (1897–1968), Polish wrestler